The 2013 IIFA Awards, officially the 14th International Indian Film Academy Awards ceremony, presented by the International Indian Film Academy honouring the Bollywood films of 2012, took place between 4–6 July 2013. The winners were announced on 6 July 2013 at The Venetian Macao, Macau for the second time after 2009. The ceremony was hosted by the actors Shah Rukh Khan and Shahid Kapoor. The ceremony was televised in India and internationally on Star Plus.

Barfi! led the ceremony with 21 nominations, followed by Gangs of Wasseypur – Part 1 with 10 nominations each, and Agneepath and Vicky Donor with 9 nominations each.

Barfi! won 14 awards, including Best Film, Best Director (for Anurag Basu), and Best Actor (for Ranbir Kapoor), thus becoming the most-awarded film at the ceremony.

Agneepath was the runner-up of the ceremony with 5 awards, including Best Villain (for Rishi Kapoor).

Nawazuddin Siddiqui received dual nominations for Best Supporting Actor for his performances in Gangs of Wasseypur – Part 1 and Talaash: The Answer Lies Within, but lost to Annu Kapoor who won the award for Vicky Donor.

Winners and nominees

Popular awards

Musical awards

Technical awards

Special Awards

Films with multiple nominations and awards

The following films received multiple nominations:
 21: Barfi!
 10: Gangs of Wasseypur - Part 1
 9: Vicky Donor and Agneepath
 5: Kahaani and Cocktail
 4: Paan Singh Tomar and Jab Tak Hai Jaan
 3: English Vinglish, Talaash: The Answer Lies Within, and OMG – Oh My God!
 2: Heroine

The following films received multiple awards:
 14: Barfi!
 5: Agneepath
 4: Vicky Donor
 2: Gangs of Wasseypur – Part 1
 2: Kahaani

References

External links

Iifa Awards
2013 Indian film awards
IIFA awards